Royal Gazette or The Royal Gazette may refer to:

 The Royal Gazette (Bermuda), a daily newspaper in Bermuda
 The Royal Gazette (Jamaica), a defunct newspaper in Jamaica, founded in 1779
 The Royal Gazette, one name of a newspaper published by James Rivington during the American Revolutionary War
 The Royal Gazette (New Brunswick), the journal of the New Brunswick Crown-in-Council, published by the Queen's Printer
 Royal Gazette and Newfoundland Advertiser or Royal Gazette, Newfoundland's first newspaper, first published in 1807 by John Ryan
 Royal Thai Government Gazette or Royal Gazette, the public journal of the Government of Thailand